A cryptotope is an antigenic site or epitope hidden in a protein or virion by surface subunits. Cryptotopes are antigenically active only after the dissociation of protein aggregates and virions Some infectious pathogens are known to escape immunological targeting by B-cells by masking antigen-binding sites as cryptotopes.
A cryptotope can also be referred to as a cryptic epitope.
Cryptotopes are becoming important for HIV vaccine research as a number of studies have shown that cryptic epitopes can be revealed or exposed when HIV gp120 binds to CD4.

References 

Immune system